Robotti is an Italian surname. Notable people with the surname include:

Aurelio Robotti (1913–1994), Italian engineer and professor
9796 Robotti, a minor planet named after Aurelio Robotti
Enzo Robotti (born 1935), former Italian footballer
Mario Robotti (1882–1955), Italian general in the Royal Italian Army

Italian-language surnames